Goldfield (In Belgium known as Goldprince and in Slovakia known as Claridge) is a brand of cigarettes that is owned by the German grocery chain Lidl. The brand is manufactured by various tobacco companies ("Landewyck Tobacco" in Germany, "Tobacco Manufacturing Ootmarsum B.V." in the Netherlands, "Austria Tabak" in Belgium and Slovakia and "Johann Wilhelm von Eicken" in Hungary).

History
Goldfield was launched in the 1990s as part of Lidl's unique range of cigarettes, along with Templeton and Claridge cigarettes.

The cigarettes are sold at the Lidl stores in Germany, Netherlands, Belgium, Romania, Hungary, Slovakia and Sweden. and were sold in Slovenia.

Products
Goldfield Full Flavor (Now called Red)
Goldfield Fine Flavor (Now called White)
Goldfield Menthol

See also

 Tobacco smoking

References

Cigarette brands